The Pietasters, also commonly referred to as Piestomp, is the first album by the ska/soul band the Pietasters. It was released in 1993 on Slugtone. Alternative recordings had earlier been released on cassette as All You Can Eat and The Ska-Rumptious 7 Inch. The CD was reissued in 2000 and made available through the band's website.

Track listing
All songs by The Pietasters unless noted.
"Intro" (1:09)
"Dollar Bill" (3:26)
"Perfect World" (2:56)
"Little Engine" (3:24)
"Night Owl"(2:43) (Tony Allen; cover of single version by Bad Habits)
"Model Citizen" (4:23)
"Factory Concerto" ("Powerhouse" by Raymond Scott, from Looney Tunes) (2:51)
"Ace Miller" (2:19)
"Metro" (2:50)
"Five Days of the Week" (3:16)
"Catalog Bohemian" (2:37)
"Pietaster" (4:26)
"Without You" (3:30)
"Factory" (4:50) (hidden track)

Personnel
 Stephen Jackson – vocals
 Talmage Bayer – vocals
 Tom Goodin – guitar	
 Chris Watt – bass guitar
 Ben Gauslin – drums
 Eric Raecke – tenor saxophone
 Rob French – trombone
 Carlos Linares – trumpet
 Caroline Boutwell – farfisa
 Cool 'Casian Don – vocals on track 6
 Nick Nichols – producer, mixer
 Cobb Ervin – producer, mixer
 Max Henkel – additional engineering

1993 debut albums
The Pietasters albums